Alligator mcgrewi is an extinct species of alligator described by K.P. Schmidt. They lived in the Early Miocene period, and their range was principally in what is now Nebraska, United States.

Measurements
The average measurements for the skull of A. mcgrewi are 145 x 96 in millimeters. Based on the length, the estimated body mass was 3 kg.

References

Alligatoridae
Miocene reptiles of North America
Fossil taxa described in 1941
Taxa named by Karl Patterson Schmidt